Lygocoris is a genus of true bugs belonging to the family Miridae.

The species of this genus are found in Eurasia and Northern America.

Species:
 Lygocoris bimaculata (Fabricius, 1803) 
 Lygocoris boninensis (Yasunaga, 1992)

References

Miridae